Ernakulam Junction is a 1971 Indian Malayalam film, directed by Vijayanarayanan and produced by Ragunath. The film stars Prem Nazir, Ragini, Sujatha and Vincent in the lead roles. The film had musical score by M. S. Baburaj.

Cast

Prem Nazir as CID Madhu, Vikram and their Father (Triple role)
Ragini as Malathi
Sujatha as Jaya (Madhu's Sister)
Vincent as Thambi 
Jesey
T. S. Muthaiah as Vasavan
Latheef as Latheef
Abbas
 Prathapachandran as Police Officer John
Bahadoor as Kunjali
Girija
Khadeeja as Vilasini
Mathew Plathottam
N. Govindankutty
Ramankutty Menon
Sadhana
Sudheer
Vanchiyoor Radha
Vimala

Soundtrack
The music was composed by M. S. Baburaj and the lyrics were written by P. Bhaskaran.

References

External links
 

1971 films
1970s Malayalam-language films
Films scored by M. S. Baburaj